Jon Howard Svendsen (born October 26, 1953 in Berkeley, California) is an American water polo player and swimmer. He was a member of the 1980 US Olympic Team, and earned a Silver Medal in the 1984 Summer Olympics.

A standout for the U.C. Berkeley Bears on three consecutive NCAA title winning water polo teams between 1973 and ‘75, Svendsen was named the Collegiate Player of the Year, Pac-10 Player of the Year and NCAA Tournament MVP in 1975.

He was a three-time All-American in 1973, ‘74 and ‘75, leading Cal State Men's Water Polo  to a combined 72-9 record during that span. Svendsen was a regular on the U.S. National Team for a decade, was a member of the 1980 U.S. Olympic Team, played at the 1975 and 1983  Pan American Games, and earned a Silver Medal at the 1984 Olympics. Svendsen, renowned for his 98 mph backhand, played in numerous other international water polo tournaments.

He is a two-time All-American in swimming (1973 and ‘75).

In 1989, Jon Svendsen was inducted into the Cal Athletics Hall of Fame and the USA Water Polo Hall of Fame.

See also
 List of Olympic medalists in water polo (men)

References

External links
 

1953 births
Living people
American male water polo players
Water polo players at the 1984 Summer Olympics
Olympic silver medalists for the United States in water polo
Medalists at the 1984 Summer Olympics